The 2018–19 Minnesota Timberwolves season was the 30th season of the franchise in the National Basketball Association (NBA).

Before the start of training camp, disgruntled All-Star Jimmy Butler requested a trade, indicating that he would not re-sign with the Timberwolves during the 2019 off-season. After multiple disputes and games where he played for Minnesota, Butler's wish was finally granted, sending him to the Philadelphia 76ers on November 12, 2018. On March 30, 2019, on his return against his former team Butler was booed during the players' introductions.

On January 6, 2019, the Timberwolves fired head coach Tom Thibodeau and named Ryan Saunders as interim head coach. With a loss against the Hornets on March 21, the Timberwolves were eliminated from playoff contention.

Draft

Roster

<noinclude>

Standings

Division

Conference

Game log

Preseason

|- style="background:#bfb;"
| 1
| September 29
| @ Golden State
| 
| Teague (17)
| Dieng (8)
| Jones (4)
| Oracle Arena19,596
| 1–0
|- style="background:#fcc;"
| 2
| October 3
| @ LA Clippers
| 
| Towns (18)
| Dieng, Towns (7)
| Tolliver (3)
| Staples Center10,099
| 1–1
|- style="background:#fcc;"
| 3
| October 5
| Oklahoma City
| 
| Towns (23)
| Towns, Wiggins (7)
| Teague, Jones (4)
| Target Center9,801
| 1–2
|- style="background:#fcc;"
| 4
| October 7
| Milwaukee
| 
| Towns (33)
| Towns (12)
| Teague (7)
| Hilton Coliseum11,603
| 1–3
|- style="background:#fcc;"
| 5
| October 12
| @ Milwaukee
| 
| Gibson (21)
| Gibson (7)
| Jones (5)
| Fiserv Forum14,724
| 1–4

Regular season

|- bgcolor=ffcccc
| 1
| October 17
| @ San Antonio
| 
| Jeff Teague (27)
| Taj Gibson (11)
| Jeff Teague (4)
| AT&T Center18,354
| 0–1
|- bgcolor=ccffcc
| 2
| October 19
| Cleveland
| 
| Jimmy Butler (33)
| Karl-Anthony Towns (9)
| Jeff Teague (7)
| Target Center18,978
| 1–1
|- bgcolor=ffcccc
| 3
| October 20
| @ Dallas
| 
| Karl-Anthony Towns (31)
| Gorgui Dieng (6)
| Jeff Teague (9)
| American Airlines Center20,205
| 1–2
|- bgcolor=ccffcc
| 4
| October 22
| Indiana
| 
| Jimmy Butler (20)
| Karl-Anthony Towns (14)
| Jeff Teague (10)
| Target Center10,371
| 2–2
|- bgcolor=ffcccc
| 5
| October 24
| @ Toronto
| 
| Jimmy Butler (23)
| Josh Okogie (11)
| Jeff Teague (9)
| Scotiabank Arena19,800
| 2–3
|- bgcolor=ffcccc
| 6
| October 26
| Milwaukee
| 
| Karl-Anthony Towns (16)
| Towns, Gibson (7)
| Jeff Teague, Jones (4)
| Target Center16,334
| 2–4
|- bgcolor=ccffcc
| 7
| October 29
| LA Lakers
| 
| Jimmy Butler (32)
| Karl-Anthony Towns (16)
| Derrick Rose (7)
| Target Center18,978
| 3–4
|- bgcolor=ccffcc
| 8
| October 31
| Utah
| 
| Derrick Rose (50)
| Karl-Anthony Towns (16)
| Derrick Rose (6)
| Target Center10,079
| 4–4

|- bgcolor=ffcccc
| 9
| November 2
| @ Golden State
| 
| Andrew Wiggins (22)
| Karl-Anthony Towns (11)
| Tyus Jones (9)
| Oracle Arena19,596
| 4–5
|- bgcolor=ffcccc
| 10
| November 4
| @ Portland
| 
| Karl-Anthony Towns (23)
| Taj Gibson (8)
| Tyus Jones (4)
| Moda Center19,522
| 4–6
|- bgcolor=ffcccc
| 11
| November 5
| @ LA Clippers
| 
| Derrick Rose (21)
| Karl-Anthony Towns (12)
| Jimmy Butler (5)
| Staples Center16,564
| 4–7
|- bgcolor=ffcccc
| 12
| November 7
| @ LA Lakers
| 
| Derrick Rose (31)
| Taj Gibson (11)
| Rose, Butler, Wiggins (5)
| Staples Center18,997
| 4–8
|- bgcolor=ffcccc
| 13
| November 9
| @ Sacramento
| 
| Karl-Anthony Towns (39)
| Karl-Anthony Towns (19)
| Jimmy Butler (8)
| Golden 1 Center17,583
| 4–9
|- bgcolor=ccffcc
| 14
| November 12
| Brooklyn
| 
| Karl-Anthony Towns (25)
| Karl-Anthony Towns (21)
| Jeff Teague (11)
| Target Center10,186
| 5–9
|- bgcolor=ccffcc
| 15
| November 14
| New Orleans
| 
| Karl-Anthony Towns (25)
| Karl-Anthony Towns (16)
| Jeff Teague (14)
| Target Center11,636
| 6–9
|- bgcolor=ccffcc
| 16
| November 16
| Portland
| 
| Andrew Wiggins (23)
| Karl-Anthony Towns (9)
| Jeff Teague (7)
| Target Center18,978
| 7–9
|- bgcolor=ffcccc
| 17
| November 18
| Memphis
| 
| Derrick Rose (18)
| Karl-Anthony Towns (20)
| Teague, Wiggins, Jones (4)
| Target Center13,179
| 7–10
|- bgcolor=ffcccc
| 18
| November 21
| Denver
| 
| Karl-Anthony Towns (22)
| Towns, Dieng, Šarić (7)
| Jeff Teague (8)
| Target Center15,086
| 7–11
|- bgcolor=ccffcc
| 19
| November 23
| @ Brooklyn
| 
| Karl-Anthony Towns (22)
| Taj Gibson (11)
| Jeff Teague (9)
| Barclays Center12,814
| 8–11
|-bgcolor=ccffcc
| 20
| November 24
| Chicago
| 
|Karl-Anthony Towns (35)
|Karl-Anthony Towns (22)
|Karl-Anthony Towns (6)
| Target Center17,119
| 9–11
|- bgcolor=ccffcc
| 21
| November 26
| @ Cleveland
| 
| Robert Covington (24)
| Karl-Anthony Towns (10)
| Jeff Teague (6)
| Quicken Loans Arena19,432
| 10–11
|-bgcolor=ccffcc
| 22
| November 28
| San Antonio
| 
| Robert Covington (21)
| Karl-Anthony Towns (11)
| Jeff Teague (9)
| Target Center11,023
| 11–11

|- bgcolor=ffcccc
| 23
| December 1
| Boston
| 
| Derrick Rose (26)
| Robert Covington (10)
| Jeff Teague (6)
| Target Center17,663
| 11–12
|- bgcolor=ccffcc
| 24
| December 3
| Houston
| 
| Karl-Anthony Towns (24)
| Towns, Gibson (11)
| Jeff Teague (7)
| Target Center13,844
| 12–12
|- bgcolor=ccffcc
| 25
| December 5
| Charlotte
| 
| Karl-Anthony Towns (35)
| Karl-Anthony Towns (12)
| Jeff Teague (18)
| Target Center11,248
| 13–12
|- bgcolor=ffcccc
| 26
| December 8
| @ Portland
| 
| Andrew Wiggins (20)
| Karl-Anthony Towns (10)
| Derrick Rose (9)
| Moda Center19,359
| 13–13
|- bgcolor=ffcccc
| 27
| December 10
| @ Golden State
| 
| Karl-Anthony Towns (31)
| Karl-Anthony Towns (11)
| Jeff Teague (11)
| Oracle Arena19,596
| 13–14
|- bgcolor=ffcccc
| 28
| December 12
| @ Sacramento
| 
| Andrew Wiggins (25)
| Karl-Anthony Towns (11)
| Jeff Teague (13)
| Golden 1 Center15,770
| 13–15
|- bgcolor=ffcccc
| 29
| December 15
| @ Phoenix
| 
| Karl-Anthony Towns (28)
| Karl-Anthony Towns (12)
| Jeff Teague (11)
| Talking Stick Resort Arena14,244
| 13–16
|- bgcolor=ccffcc
| 30
| December 17
| Sacramento
| 
| Andrew Wiggins (17)
| Karl-Anthony Towns (14)
| Derrick Rose (11)
| Target Center12,417
| 14–16
|- bgcolor=ffcccc
| 31
| December 19
| Detroit
| 
| Derrick Rose (33)
| Towns, Gibson (8)
| Derrick Rose (7)
| Target Center15,883
| 14–17
|- bgcolor=ffcccc
| 32
| December 21
| @ San Antonio
| 
| Andrew Wiggins (15)
| Covington, Gibson (7)
| Towns, Šarić (4)
| AT&T Center17,708
| 14–18
|- bgcolor=ccffcc
| 33
| December 23
| @ Oklahoma City
| 
| Andrew Wiggins (30)
| Dario Šarić (8)
| Karl-Anthony Towns (6)
| Chesapeake Energy Arena18,203
| 15–18
|- bgcolor=ccffcc
| 34
| December 26
| @ Chicago
| 
| Derrick Rose (24)
| Karl-Anthony Towns (20)
| Derrick Rose (8)
| United Center21,852
| 16–18
|- bgcolor=ffcccc
| 35
| December 28
| Atlanta
| 
| Robert Covington (28)
| Karl-Anthony Towns (19)
| Derrick Rose (9)
| Target Center18,978
| 16–19
|- bgcolor=ccffcc
| 36
| December 30
| @ Miami
| 
| Karl-Anthony Towns (34)
| Karl-Anthony Towns (18)
| Karl-Anthony Towns (7)
| AmericanAirlines Arena19,600
| 17–19
|- bgcolor=ffcccc
| 37
| December 31
| @ New Orleans
| 
| Karl-Anthony Towns (28)
| Karl-Anthony Towns (17)
| Tyus Jones (13)
| Smoothie King Center14,904
| 17–20

|- bgcolor=ffcccc
| 38
| January 2
| @ Boston
| 
| Andrew Wiggins (31)
| Karl-Anthony Towns (12)
| Tyus Jones (9)
| TD Garden18,624
| 17–21
|- bgcolor=ccffcc
| 39
| January 4
| Orlando
| 
| Karl-Anthony Towns (29)
| Karl-Anthony Towns (15)
| Jeff Teague (10)
| Target Center14,355
| 18–21
|- bgcolor=ccffcc
| 40
| January 6
| LA Lakers
| 
| Towns, Wiggins (28)
| Karl-Anthony Towns (18)
| Jeff Teague (11)
| Target Center18,978
| 19–21
|- bgcolor=ccffcc
| 41
| January 8
| @ Oklahoma City
| 
| Andrew Wiggins (40)
| Andrew Wiggins (10)
| Jeff Teague (5)
| Chesapeake Energy Arena18,203
| 20–21
|- bgcolor=ffcccc
| 42
| January 11
| Dallas
| 
| Karl-Anthony Towns (30)
| Taj Gibson (15)
| Tyus Jones (9)
| Target Center18,978
| 20–22
|- bgcolor=ccffcc
| 43
| January 12
| New Orleans
| 
| Karl-Anthony Towns (27)
| Karl-Anthony Towns (27)
| Jeff Teague (10)
| Target Center16,384
| 21–22
|- bgcolor=ffcccc
| 44
| January 15
| @ Philadelphia
| 
| Derrick Rose (15)
| Gorgui Dieng (9)
| Derrick Rose (4)
| Wells Fargo Center20,487
| 21–23
|- style="background:#fcc
| 45
| January 18
| San Antonio
| 
| Karl-Anthony Towns (23)
| Taj Gibson (11)
| Teague, Rose (6)
| Target Center17,222
| 21–24
|- style="background:#cfc
| 46
| January 20
| Phoenix
| 
| Karl-Anthony Towns (30)
| Karl-Anthony Towns (12)
| Jeff Teague (8)
| Target Center14,607
| 22–24
|- style="background:#cfc
| 47
| January 22
| @ Phoenix
| 
| Karl-Anthony Towns (25)
| Karl-Anthony Towns (18)
| Karl-Anthony Towns (7)
| Talking Stick Resort Arena14,460
| 23–24
|- style="background:#cfc
| 48
| January 24
| @ LA Lakers
| 
| Karl-Anthony Towns (27)
| Karl-Anthony Towns (12)
| Jerryd Bayless (8)
| Staples Center18,997
| 24–24
|- style="background:#fcc
| 49
| January 25
| @ Utah
| 
| Karl-Anthony Towns (33)
| Andrew Wiggins (11)
| Jerryd Bayless (5)
| Vivint Smart Home Arena18,306
| 24–25
|- style="background:#fcc
| 50
| January 27
| Utah
| 
| Andrew Wiggins (35)
| Dario Šarić (11)
| Karl-Anthony Towns (7)
| Target Center14,542
| 24–26
|- style="background:#cfc
| 51
| January 30
| Memphis
| 
| Jerryd Bayless (19)
| Karl-Anthony Towns (10)
| Jerryd Bayless (12)
| Target Center13,615
| 25–26

|- style="background:#fcc
| 52
| February 2
| Denver
| 
| Karl-Anthony Towns (31)
| Karl-Anthony Towns (12)
| Jerryd Bayless (10)
| Target Center17,208
| 25–27
|- style="background:#fcc
| 53
| February 5
| @ Memphis
| 
| Karl-Anthony Towns (26)
| Karl-Anthony Towns (18)
| Jerryd Bayless (8)
| FedExForum13,454
| 25–28
|- style="background:#fcc
| 54
| February 7
| @ Orlando
| 
| Karl-Anthony Towns (27)
| Karl-Anthony Towns (11)
| Isaiah Canaan (6)
| Amway Center17,184
| 25–29
|- style="background:#fcc
| 55
| February 8
| @ New Orleans
| 
| Karl-Anthony Towns (32)
| Andrew Wiggins (10)
| Andrew Wiggins (7)
| Smoothie King Center16,980
| 25–30
|- style="background:#cfc
| 56
| February 11
| LA Clippers
| 
| Karl-Anthony Towns (24)
| Karl-Anthony Towns (10)
| Jeff Teague (10)
| Target Center13,782
| 26–30
|- style="background:#cfc
| 57
| February 13
| Houston
| 
| Jeff Teague (27)
| Karl-Anthony Towns (9)
| Jeff Teague (12)
| Target Center15,131
| 27–30
|- style="background:#cfc
| 58
| February 22
| @ N. Y. Knicks
| 
| Derrick Rose (20)
| Taj Gibson (11)
| Jeff Teague (11)
| Madison Square Garden19,096
| 28–30
|- style="background:#fcc
| 59
| February 23
| @ Milwaukee
| 
| Derrick Rose (23)
| Andrew Wiggins (9)
| Tyus Jones (9)
| Fiserv Forum17,972
| 28–31
|- style="background:#cfc
| 60
| February 25
| Sacramento
| 
| Karl-Anthony Towns (34)
| Karl-Anthony Towns (21)
| Tyus Jones (8)
| Target Center13,691
| 29–31
|- style="background:#fcc
| 61
| February 27
| @ Atlanta
| 
| Karl-Anthony Towns (37)
| Karl-Anthony Towns (18)
| Tyus Jones (11)
| State Farm Arena14,101
| 29–32
|- style="background:#fcc
| 62
| February 28
| @ Indiana
| 
| Karl-Anthony Towns (47)
| Karl-Anthony Towns (14)
| Jeff Teague (5)
| Bankers Life Fieldhouse17,003
| 29–33

|- style="background:#fcc
| 63
| March 3
| @ Washington
| 
| Karl-Anthony Towns (28)
| Karl-Anthony Towns (10)
| Jeff Teague (8)
| Capital One Arena17,869
| 29–34
|- style="background:#cfc
| 64
| March 5
| Oklahoma City
| 
| Karl-Anthony Towns (41)
| Karl-Anthony Towns (14)
| Jeff Teague (12)
| Target Center15,728
| 30–34
|- style="background:#fcc
| 65
| March 6
| @ Detroit
| 
| Karl-Anthony Towns (24)
| Dario Šarić (7)
| Jeff Teague (8)
| Little Caesars Arena15,240
| 30–35
|- style="background:#cfc
| 66
| March 9
| Washington
| 
| Karl-Anthony Towns (40)
| Karl-Anthony Towns (16)
| Jeff Teague (8)
| Target Center14,381
| 31–35
|- style="background:#cfc
| 67
| March 10
| N. Y. Knicks
| 
| Taj Gibson (25)
| Taj Gibson (8)
| Jeff Teague (10)
| Target Center13,806
| 32–35
|- style="background:#fcc
| 68
| March 12
| @ Denver
| 
| Karl-Anthony Towns (34)
| Karl-Anthony Towns (10)
| Tolliver, Bates-Diop, Williams (4)
| Pepsi Center16,874
| 32–36
|- style="background:#fcc
| 69
| March 14
| @ Utah
| 
| Karl-Anthony Towns (26)
| Karl-Anthony Towns (12)
| Tyus Jones (9)
| Vivint Smart Home Arena18,306
| 32–37
|- style="background:#fcc
| 70
| March 17
| @ Houston
| 
| Karl-Anthony Towns (22)
| Karl-Anthony Towns (10)
| Karl-Anthony Towns (6)
| Toyota Center18,055
| 32–38
|- style="background:#fcc
| 71
| March 19
| Golden State
| 
| Karl-Anthony Towns (24)
| Karl-Anthony Towns (22)
| Tyus Jones (7)
| Target Center17,964
| 32–39
|- style="background:#fcc
| 72
| March 21
| @ Charlotte
| 
| Karl-Anthony Towns (21)
| Karl-Anthony Towns (16)
| Tyus Jones (7)
| Spectrum Center15,576
| 32–40
|- style="background:#cfc
| 73
| March 23
| @ Memphis
| 
| Karl-Anthony Towns (33)
| Karl-Anthony Towns (23)
| Tyus Jones (9)
| FedExForum16,977
| 33–40
|- style="background:#fcc
| 74
| March 26
| L. A. Clippers
| 
| Karl-Anthony Towns (24)
| Karl-Anthony Towns (13)
| Tyus Jones (8)
| Target Center13,176
| 33–41
|- style="background:#cfc
| 75
| March 29
| Golden State
| 
| Andrew Wiggins (24)
| Karl-Anthony Towns (13)
| Karl-Anthony Towns (7)
| Target Center18,978
| 34–41
|- style="background:#fcc
| 76
| March 30
| Philadelphia
| 
| Andrew Wiggins (24)
| Karl-Anthony Towns (7)
| Jerryd Bayless (7)
| Target Center18,978
| 34–42

|- style="background:#fcc
| 77
| April 1
| Portland
| 
| Andrew Wiggins (21)
| Karl-Anthony Towns (12)
| Tyus Jones (10)
| Target Center11,209
| 34–43
|- style="background:#cfc
| 78
| April 3
| @ Dallas
| 
| Karl-Anthony Towns (28)
| Karl-Anthony Towns (13)
| Andrew Wiggins (7)
| American Airlines Center19,576
| 35–43
|- style="background:#cfc
| 79
| April 5
| Miami
| 
| Šarić, Dieng (19)
| Karl-Anthony Towns (12)
| Šarić, Bayless (5)
| Target Center17,763
| 36–43
|- style="background:#fcc
| 80
| April 7
| Oklahoma City
| 
| Karl-Anthony Towns (35)
| Karl-Anthony Towns (7)
| Tyus Jones (13)
| Target Center18,978
| 36–44
|- style="background:#fcc
| 81
| April 9
| Toronto
| 
| Wiggins, Dieng (16)
| Dario Šarić (9)
| Tyus Jones (10)
| Target Center16,119
| 36–45
|- style="background:#fcc
| 82
| April 10
| @ Denver
| 
| Andrew Wiggins (25)
| Gorgui Dieng (11)
| Tyus Jones (8)
| Pepsi Center16,332
| 36–46

Player statistics

|-
| align="left"| || align="center"| SF
| 30 || 3 || 503 || 83 || 17 || 18 || 14 || 151
|-
| align="left"|≠ || align="center"| PG
| 34 || 6 || 657 || 62 || 119 || 18 || 2 || 209
|-
| align="left"|† || align="center"| SG
| 10 || 10 || 361 || 52 || 43 || 24 || 10 || 213
|-
| align="left"|≠ || align="center"| PG
| 7 || 1 || 95 || 5 || 19 || 2 || 1 || 33
|-
| align="left"|≠ || align="center"| SF
| 22 || 22 || 763 || 126 || 32 || 50 || 24 || 318
|-
| align="left"|≠ || align="center"| SF
| 1 || 0 || 12 || 2 || 1 || 1 || 0 || 6
|-
| align="left"| || align="center"| SF
| 22 || 2 || 392 || 73 || 18 || 15 || 8 || 157
|-
| align="left"| || align="center"| C
| 76 || 2 || 1,031 || 311 || 72 || 48 || 41 || 485
|-
| align="left"| || align="center"| PF
| 70 || 57 || 1,686 || 458 || 84 || 53 || 39 || 753
|-
| align="left"| || align="center"| PG
| 68 || 23 || 1,560 || 134 || 327 || 81 || 5 || 468
|-
| align="left"|‡ || align="center"| SF
| 13 || 0 || 64 || 4 || 5 || 1 || 0 || 27
|-
| align="left"| || align="center"| SG
| 74 || 52 || 1,757 || 218 || 91 || style=";"|88 || 33 || 570
|-
| align="left"|≠ || align="center"| SG
| 19 || 0 || 259 || 31 || 13 || 6 || 2 || 95
|-
| align="left"| || align="center"| PG
| 51 || 13 || 1,392 || 140 || 220 || 31 || 12 || 917
|-
| align="left"|≠ || align="center"| PF
| 68 || 28 || 1,627 || 371 || 101 || 41 || 6 || 714
|-
| align="left"| || align="center"| PG
| 42 || 41 || 1,264 || 106 || style=";"|343 || 43 || 18 || 510
|-
| align="left"| || align="center"| SG
| 14 || 0 || 111 || 6 || 12 || 3 || 2 || 31
|-
| align="left"| || align="center"| PF
| 65 || 0 || 1,079 || 177 || 46 || 17 || 21 || 326
|-
| align="left"| || align="center"| C
| style=";"|77 || style=";"|77 || style=";"|2,545 || style=";"|954 || 259 || 67 || style=";"|125 || style=";"|1,880
|-
| align="left"| || align="center"| SF
| 73 || 73 || 2,543 || 352 || 184 || 70 || 48 || 1,321
|-
| align="left"| || align="center"| SG
| 15 || 0 || 128 || 8 || 12 || 6 || 0 || 39
|}
After all games.
‡Waived during the season
†Traded during the season
≠Acquired during the season

Transactions

Free agents

Re-signed

Additions

Subtractions

References

2018–19
Minnesota
2018 in sports in Minnesota
2019 in sports in Minnesota